Road to Bloodshed is the first and only studio album by American heavy metal band Sanctity, released in the United States on April 24, 2007 through Roadrunner Records.

Track listing 
 "Beneath the Machine" – 3:19
 "Brotherhood of Destruction" – 4:21
 "Road to Bloodshed" – 3:29
 "Laws of Reason" – 4:26
 "Billy Seals" – 3:28
 "Zeppo" – 4:12
 "Beloved Killer" – 3:19
 "The Shape of Things" – 3:34
 "Flatline" – 3:26
 "The Rift Between" – 3:38
 "Seconds" – 3:38
 "Once Again" – 4:30
 "Haze of Gray"  3:46 (Japan only bonus track)

Personnel
 Jared MacEachern – vocals, Rhythm Guitar
 Zeff Childress – Lead Guitar
 Derek Anderson – Bass
 Jeremy London – drums

References

2007 debut albums
Sanctity (band) albums
Roadrunner Records albums
Albums produced by Jason Suecof